The Buick Y-Job, produced by Buick in 1938, was the auto industry's first concept car (a model intended to show new technology or designs but not be mass-produced for sale to consumers).  Designed by Harley J. Earl, the car had power-operated hidden headlamps, a "gunsight" hood ornament, electric windows, wraparound bumpers, flush door handles, and prefigured styling cues used by Buick until the 1950s and the vertical waterfall grille design still used by Buick today. It used a Buick Super chassis, indicated by the word "Super" located above the rear license plate.

The car was driven for a number of years by Harley Earl, until he replaced it with a 1951 model car. Sometime after that, the car was restored at the Henry Ford Museum, until 1993 when it was returned to the GM Design Center.

The "Y" in the name has two explanations:
 All experimental cars were called "X", so Earl simply went to the next letter in the alphabet.
 The "Y" designation was selected by Earl because it was used extensively in the aviation industry denoting the most advanced prototypes.

In 2001, Buick recreated the Y-job with modern advancements called the Buick Blackhawk drawing extensively from the Y-job.

References

External links 
 Why the 'Y-Job' — Harley Earl and the Buick Dream Car
 World's first concept car

Y-Job
Cars introduced in 1940
Sports cars
Convertibles